Ione Agoney Jiménez Cabrera (born 13 October 1985) is a Spanish footballer who plays as a centre back for Austrian Regional League Club Sc Mannsdorf

Honors
Grödig
Erste Liga (1): 2012-13

External links

Living people
1985 births
Spanish footballers
Footballers from the Canary Islands
Association football defenders
Segunda División players
Segunda División B players
Austrian Football Bundesliga players
2. Liga (Austria) players
Austrian Regionalliga players
UD Las Palmas players
CA Osasuna B players
Jerez Industrial CF players
SV Grödig players
SC Rheindorf Altach players
FC Admira Wacker Mödling players
WSG Tirol players
Spanish expatriate footballers
Expatriate footballers in Austria
Spanish expatriate sportspeople in Austria